Mark John Powell (born 4 November 1980, Northampton) was an English professional cricketer for Northamptonshire from the years 2000 to 2004.  Since then he has retired from professional cricket to take up a business career in London, England where he also continued to play club Cricket in the Middlesex Premier League for Finchley between 2006 and 2009.

Career
Mark Powell played a total of 42 Cricket matches for Northamptonshire in First Class and One day competitions, as well as appearances for the England Under-15 team in 1996 and the Loughborough UCCE in 2000 to 2002. His First Class high score of 108 not out in 2002 was achieved during a record-breaking first wicket partnership of 375, in which Rob White scored 277.

External links

1980 births
English cricketers
Living people
Northamptonshire cricketers
Cricketers from Northampton